The Ox is the alias of two characters appearing in American comic books published by Marvel Comics. The original incarnation, Raymond Bloch, is one of the founding members of the Enforcers, a team usually in the employment of crime bosses like the Kingpin, Mister Fear, or Hammerhead, and a recurring threat of the superheroes Spider-Man and Daredevil. The second incarnation, Ronald Bloch, also became a member of the Enforcers after his twin brother's apparent death.

Publication history
The Raymond Bloch incarnation of Ox first appeared in The Amazing Spider-Man #10 (March 1964), and was created by Stan Lee and Steve Ditko. The character subsequently appears in The Amazing Spider-Man #14 (July 1964), #19 (December 1964), The Amazing Spider-Man Annual #1 (1964), Daredevil #15 (April 1966), and #86 (April 1972)

The Ronald Bloch incarnation of Ox first appeared in The Spectacular Spider-Man #19-20 (June–July 1978), and was created by Bill Mantlo and Sal Buscema. This character subsequently appears in Dazzler #7-8 (October–September 1981), Marvel Team-Up #138 (February 1984), Tales of the Marvels: Inner Demons #1 (1996), She-Hulk #1 (December 2005), Thunderbolts #104 (September 2006), Civil War: Thunderbolts - Swimming With Sharks #1 (January 2007), Daredevil #99-100 (September–October 2007), World War Hulk: Gamma Corps #2 (October 2007), Daredevil #102-105 (January–April 2008), and The Amazing Spider-Man #552-553 (April–May 2008), and #562-563 (August 2008).

Ox appeared as part of the "Enforcers" entry in the Official Handbook of the Marvel Universe Deluxe Edition #4.

Fictional character biography

Raymond Bloch
Nothing is known about Raymond Bloch's history before founding the Enforcers alongside Fancy Dan and Montana, although he was born in Seaside Heights, New Jersey. Ox is a burly strongman possessing superhuman strength.

Ox eventually falls under Mister Fear's control, who partners him with the Eel as The Fellowship of Fear, as he is released earlier than the other Enforcers. Fear attempts to use his enthralled minions to destroy Daredevil, but all three are defeated.

Ox became fatally afflicted with radiation poisoning during his criminal machinations. He breaks out of prison with reclusive scientist Dr. Karl Stragg using a mind-transfer device to "swap bodies" with the villain, craving control of Ox's strength. "Ox" dies in combat with Daredevil when he fell to his death.

Meanwhile, the original Ox sought to build a new life in the scientist's body. However, this hope for redemption proves short-lived. While acting as a test subject for radioactive isotopes, the scientist's body mutates into an unstable duplicate of Ox's original frame. Ox goes on a rampage, soon succumbing to the radiation's lethal effects. He explodes in battle with Daredevil.

Ox is later revealed to have survived after being found in a near-death within an alley by Kingpin's minions and is revitalized by Kingpin. Upon his revitalization, Kingpin later causes Ox to reunite with Fancy Dan and Montana and resume his role with the Enforcers.

During the "Heroic Age" storyline, Ox is seen as an inmate at the Raft.

As part of the All-New, All-Different Marvel event, Ox was robbing a store with no resistance until he runs into Miles Morales who manages to use his Venom Blast on him. Ox is transported to the supervillain prison called the Cellar (which used to be Ryker's Island until it was rebuilt by Regent's Empire Unlimited) and placed in a special tube by Regent's servant Dr. Shannon Stillwell alongside Walrus. When Ox asks Shannon Stillwell how they are supposed to live in these tubes, Shannon states that they will not and the tubes are flooded which supposedly kills Ox and Walrus.

Ox later appears as a member of the Hateful Hexad alongside Bearboarguy, Gibbon, Squid, Swarm, and White Rabbit. During the Hateful Hexad's disastrous fight against Spider-Man and Deadpool, the battle is crashed by Itsy Bitsy who stabs Ox in the back with three swords.

During the Dead No More: The Clone Conspiracy storyline, Ox is among the villains cloned by Jackal and his company New U Technologies.

During the "Hunted" storyline, Ox is among the animal-themed characters that were captured by Taskmaster and Black Ant for Kraven the Hunter's Great Hunt which is sponsored by Arcade's company Arcade Industries. He was seen fighting the Hunter-Bots created by Arcade Industries.

Ronald Bloch
Ronald Bloch is the twin brother of Raymond Bloch. He becomes the second Ox and is paired with the remaining Enforcers following his twin brother's apparent death. Comments and actions taken by this character suggest he may be, in fact, one of the two versions of the original, somehow having survived his battles with Daredevil.

Ox was later seen working as a tough for various underworld figures, such as the current Mr. Fear,<ref>'Daredevil vol. 2 #98-105. Marvel Comics.</ref> the Kingpin, and the Maggia. While collecting a gambling debt on behalf of the criminal 'Fat Teddy', he is confronted by Spider-Man. The hero stops the mugging, but then experiences the delusion that Ox is the more powerful, stronger villain Morlun. Spider-Man, already afflicted by illness and the belief of being doomed to die, beats upon Ox until stopped by an enraged Daredevil. Ox is left in a pool of blood and Daredevil makes sure the man receives medical attention.

During the "Civil War" event, Ox is arrested by Baron Zemo and is forced to either join Zemo's team of Thunderbolts, or go to jail. Ox chooses to join. He and fellow villains King Cobra and Unicorn attack Thunderbolts member Swordsman as part of a training mission. All three are swiftly defeated.

Later, Ox and the other Enforcers came back together to work for Mister Fear, which pitted them directly against Daredevil. After Mister Fear's arrest, the Enforcers are taken in by the Hood's organization.

Following the events of Spider-Man: Brand New Day, Ox and the Enforcers are patrons at the Bar with No Name. They take bets with a person calling himself "The Bookie" over whether Spider-Man will show up to battle "Basher" (an unknown villain who claimed to have fought the hero in the past) in the broadcast fight on YouTube. Spider-Man shows up, but is revealed to be a fake when the real Spider-Man arrives and the imposter is revealed to be Screwball in disguise. The Enforcers decide to get revenge for The Bookie's deception, capturing him. The Bookie's father calls Spider-Man for assistance, and he agrees to help. Spider-Man defeats Fancy Dan and Montana, and saves Ox from being flattened by a falling roller coaster. Grateful for the save, Ox agrees to come along quietly.

Powers and abilities
Both versions of Ox possess tremendous strength and resistance to injury for a human without powers.

Other characters named "Ox"
Another character bearing the name of Ox appeared in Alpha Flight #66 as a member of China Force. Nothing has been revealed about the origins of this villain. He, along with other superhuman agents, formed China Force—the official superhuman team of China. The team was intended to be China's first line of defense against the U.S. and U.S.S.R's numerous super humans. However, China Force saw little action and split up under unexplained circumstances. The group was later reformed and sent to retrieve the Jade Dragon from Canada. This Ox has enhanced strength, agility, endurance and wears a suit of armor that provides him with some protection from physical attack.

Other versions

Earth-001
During the Spider-Verse storyline, the Earth-001 version of Ox appears as a member of Verna's Hounds. He was killed by Assassin Spider-Man, Superior Spider-Man, and Spider-Punk.

Earth X
In the Earth X universe, Ox had mutated to having the form of a humanoid ox (somewhat similar to a Minotaur). He and his fellow Enforcers would be hired as protectors of President Norman Osborn. However, the Ox and the other Enforcers would become slaves of the Red Skull when he invaded New York. They would be a part of Red Skull's army that battles against Captain America and the heroes he gathered from around the world to stop Red Skull's conquest of the world. Ox's whereabouts following Red Skull's death remain unrevealed.

House of M
In the House of M series, Ox is one of Rhino's friends who helped him attack and detain the Green Goblin for ruining the best chance at a good life Rhino ever had.

Marvel Noir
In the Marvel Noir series, Ox and the other Enforces are muscle for Norman Osborn.

Ultimate Marvel
The Ultimate Marvel version of Ox is Bruno Sanchez, an exceptionally tall and strong bald Afro-Cuban, who worked for the Kingpin until he was arrested. Upon Kingpin's release from jail, Ox was rehired. Once in jail, Ox was revealed not to be that evil, just misguided.

In other media
 The Raymond Bloch incarnation of Ox appeared in the Spider-Man episode "Blueprint for Crime". This version is portrayed as stupid and greedy.
 The Raymond Bloch incarnation of Ox appeared in The Spectacular Spider-Man, voiced by Clancy Brown in "Survival of the Fittest" and Danny Trejo in all subsequent appearances. This version is Hispanic. In "Survival of the Fittest", Ox and his fellow Enforcers are hired by the crime boss Tombstone to kill Spider-Man, only to be defeated by him and left for the police. After escaping prison in the episode "Group Therapy", Ox returns in the episode "Probable Cause", wherein he receives a power suit that increases his strength from the Tinkerer. He joins Fancy Dan as Ricochet and Montana as Shocker to become the New Enforcers and seek revenge on Spider-Man, only to be captured and arrested once more. In the episode "Opening Night", Ox had been remanded to the Vault. While Spider-Man was there to test the security system, the Green Goblin releases the inmates to kill him, but they are all eventually recaptured in the end.
 The Raymond Bloch incarnation of Ox appears in the Ultimate Spider-Man'' episode "Nightmare on Christmas", voiced by Mark Hamill.

References

External links
 Ox (Raymond Bloch) at Marvel Wiki
 Ox (Ronald Bloch) at Comic Vine

Articles about multiple fictional characters
Characters created by Stan Lee
Characters created by Steve Ditko
Comics characters introduced in 1964
Fictional characters from New Jersey
Fictional henchmen
Marvel Comics characters with superhuman strength
Marvel Comics male supervillains
Marvel Comics supervillains
Spider-Man characters
Twin characters in comics